SUAS is the Southampton University Air Squadron, an organisation affiliated with the University of Southampton.

SUAS or Suas may also refer to:

Small unmanned aircraft system (SUAS or sUAS), a form of unmanned aerial vehicle
Suas (see), an ancient Roman Catholic diocese in North Africa
Suas Educational Development, an educational charity registered in Ireland